Yishan Road is the name of an interchange station between Lines 3, 4 and 9 on the Shanghai Metro. It is the southernmost station shared by Line 3 and Line 4, although the two lines do not share tracks (the Line 4 station is underground).

While the Line 4 platform was formerly in a separate area from Lines 3 and 9, the three platforms of all three lines are now connected via an above-ground passageway.

Station Layout

Gallery

References

Railway stations in Shanghai
Shanghai Metro stations in Xuhui District
Line 3, Shanghai Metro
Line 4, Shanghai Metro
Line 9, Shanghai Metro
Railway stations in China opened in 2000
Xuhui District